Tres Cruces (Argentina) is a town and municipality in Jujuy Province in Argentina, about 20 km from Iturbe.

References

Populated places in Jujuy Province